Paul Swain may refer to:

 Paul Swain (politician) (born 1951), New Zealand politician
 Paul J. Swain (born 1943), American Roman Catholic bishop